This is a list of the largest Metropolitan Statistical Areas in the American Midwest.  These states are Illinois, Indiana, Iowa, Kansas, Michigan, Minnesota, Missouri, Ohio, Nebraska, North Dakota, South Dakota and Wisconsin. Part of the Great Lakes Megalopolis.

Notes

References 

Midwestern
Midwestern United States